Salui is a small fishing village on the western shore of Lake Malawi.  In 2011, the population of the village was estimated at 800. 

The village consists of an estimated 100 straw and mud-straw huts of traditional Malawian construction separated into three small groups by drainage or irrigation areas.  Dugout canoe-type boats are used by the local fishermen, as well as fishing barrier/walls and nets for communal or group fishing.  A single Baptist church serves the village.  As of June 2011 the church pastor was Abusa (Pastor) Nathan.  

The villagers grow rice, sugar cane, and corn using water from Lake Malawi.  The soil is sandy at the beach area, but turns to a clay/loam within a few hundred meters of the shoreline, enabling the creation of patties for rice growth.  

The village is accessible by an improved, single-lane dirt road which extends east from the two-lane, asphalt-surface route M5.  The M5 serves as a major artery between the two larger town/cities nearby; Salima to the south, and Mzuzu to the north.

The village does not have access to electricity or running water.  Salui is home to many orphaned children, most likely as a result of a large number of adult deaths due to HIV infection.

Notes

Populated places in Central Region, Malawi